People who served as the mayor of the Municipality of Alexandria are:

References

Mayors Alexandria
Alexandria, Mayors
Mayors of Alexandria